The 1967 Liberty Bowl was a college football postseason bowl game played on December 16, 1967, at Liberty Bowl Memorial Stadium in Memphis, Tennessee. The ninth edition of the Liberty Bowl, it featured the NC State Wolfpack of the Atlantic Coast Conference (ACC) and the Georgia Bulldogs of the Southeastern Conference (SEC).

Background
The Wolfpack finished 2nd in the Atlantic Coast Conference. The Bulldogs finished 5th in the Southeastern Conference. This was NC State's first bowl since 1963, which was also in the Liberty Bowl. This was Georgia's first ever Liberty Bowl.

Game summary
A 65 yard drive by the Wolfpack culminated with a Jim Donnan touchdown pass to Harry Martel to make it 7-0 in the 2nd. Georgia responded with a 68 yard drive with Ronnie Jenkins scoring on a touchdown plunge to tie it before halftime. In the second half, the game was decided in the final minutes. NC State drove 73 yards and scored on a Tony Barchuk touchdown run to make it 14-7. Later on, the Bulldogs went on a 98 yard drive, trying to tie the score late in the game. However, QB Kent Lawrence was stopped one yard short of the goal line, as the Wolfpack held on to win the game. Donnan went 16-of-24 for 121 yards and a touchdown in an MVP effort.

Jim Donnan later went on to coach the Georgia Bulldogs.

Aftermath
Georgia returned to the Liberty Bowl 20 years later in 1987. The Wolfpack returned in 1973.

Statistics

References

Liberty Bowl
Liberty Bowl
Georgia Bulldogs football bowl games
NC State Wolfpack football bowl games
December 1967 sports events in the United States
1967 in sports in Tennessee